This is an incomplete list of major wildfires in Washington state history.

Washington wildfires ordered by size

With a lag of 1 to 2 years, more or less complete data is available from 2002 on via the website with incident status summaries maintained by the National Fire and Aviation Management. Older fires are increasingly underreported. For example, none of the wildfires of 1926-31 and 1943 that together destroyed more than 500,000 acres of the Colville National Forest are included.

Year-by-year statistics

Wildfire seasons are defined by Washington state law as lasting from April 15 through October 15 of each year, allowing for burn bans and other restrictions to be imposed on state lands by the Washington State Department of Natural Resources during that time. According to a North American Seasonal Fire Assessment and Outlook report issued in June, 2019, the summer months represent peak fire season.

Notes

References

External links
Okanogan National Forest
Pacific Northwest National Incident Management Team 2
Historical Incident ICS-209 Reports

Firefighting in Washington (state)
Forestry in the United States

Washington